Drabble is a British surname.

Origins 
Two possible origins have been suggested for the name. One possible source is a derivation from an Old English personal name "Drabbe", from before the 7th-century. This is recorded as a name of a Peterborough festerman, in 963 - 992, in A. J. Robertson's Anglo Saxon Charters.

Notable people with the surname 
Eric Frederic Drabble (1877–1933), English botanist
Frank Drabble (1888–1964), English footballer
Gareth Drabble (born 1990), rugby union player
Geoff Drabble (born 1959), British businessman
Margaret Drabble (born 1939), English novelist, biographer, and critic
Phil Drabble (1914–2007), English author and television presenter

References